Caden is a given name in the United States and Canada, most commonly used for males. Its popularity is also increased by the popularity of similar-sounding names such as Aidan, Braden, Hayden, and Jaden.

Origin

Etymology

English
The name is also probably derived from the Old English or Anglo-Saxon name Cade, meaning "strength"  "round" or "gentle" in Old English.

Welsh
Another possible origin for the name is it is derived from the Welsh name Cadell, meaning "loyalty" "resilience" "Warring" or "spirit of battle" and/or "spirit of war". Cad, meaning "war" or "battle" in Welsh.

Irish and Scottish
The name is also probably derived from the Irish names Cathán and Callan, both meaning "battle" in Irish and Scottish, and the surnames Mac Cadáin or McCadden, both meaning "son of Cadán" in Irish and Scottish, names possibly derived from the Old Irish “cath”, from Proto-Celtic “*katus”, meaning “battle”.

Spelling and derivatives
The name has several alternative spellings.

Arabic derivatives
In the Arabic language the name usually begins with the letter K and is spelled as Kaden, Kadeen, Kadein, Kadyn, Kaeden, Kaedin, Kaedon, Kaedyn, Kaidan, Kaiden, Kaidin, Kaydan and Kayden, Khaden.

English and Celtic derivatives
In English and Celtic languages the name can begin with either the Letter C or K and is spelled as Cadan, Caedan, Caden, Caedon, Caedyn, Caiden, Cadon, Caidon,  Caydan, Cayden, Kadan, Kaden, Kadeen, Kadein, Kadyn, Kaedan, Kaeden, Kaedin, Kaedon, Kaedyn, Kaidan, Kaiden, Kyden, Kaidin, Kaydan and Kayden.

Notable people with the given name "Caden" include

Caden Clark (born 2003), American soccer player
Caden Manson, American art director
Caden McLoughlin (born 2005), Costa Rican footballer
Caden Shields (born 1988), New Zealand runner
Caden Stafford (born 2003), American soccer player
Caden Sterns (born 1999), American football player
Caden Tomy (born 2001/2002), Canadian footballer

Notable people with the given name "Cayden" include

Cayden Boyd (born 1994), American actor
Cayden Lapcevich (born 1999), American stock car racing driver
Cayden Primeau (born 1999), American ice hockey player
Cayden Wallace (born 2001), American baseball player

See also
Kaden (name), a page for people with the name "Kaden"

References

Given names
English given names
English-language unisex given names
English unisex given names
English masculine given names
English feminine given names
Celtic given names
Welsh masculine given names
Irish masculine given names
Scottish masculine given names
Arabic masculine given names
Masculine given names
Feminine given names